Ankleshwar is one of the 182 Legislative Assembly constituencies of Gujarat state in India. It is part of Bharuch district.

List of segments
This assembly seat represents the following segments,

 Ankleshwar Taluka (Part) Villages –Sengpur, jitali, dadhal, Dhanturiya, Taria, Matied, Haripura, Sakkarpor, Sarfuddin, Borbhatha, Borbhatha Bet, Surwadi, Divi, Diva, Pungam, Sajod, Kanwa, Nangal, Boidara, Gadkhol, Piraman, Amboli, Adol, Hajat, Sarthan, Motwan, Telva, Piludara, Umarwada, Kapodara, Bhadkodara, Kosamadi, Bakrol, Safipura, Alonj, Pardi Idris, Karmali, Panoli, Sanjali, Kharod, Bhadi, Ravidra, Adadara, Sisodara, Utiyadara, Bharan, Ankleshwar (M), Ankleshwar (INA)
 Hansot Taluka

Member of Legislative Assembly
2007 - Ishwarsinh Patel, Bharatiya Janata Party
2012 - Ishwarsinh Patel, Bharatiya Janata Party

Election results

2022

2017

2012

See also
 List of constituencies of the Gujarat Legislative Assembly
 Bharuch district
 Gujarat Legislative Assembly

References

External links
 

Assembly constituencies of Gujarat
Ankleshwar